Rashid Sultan Atkins (born May 14, 1975), is an American former professional basketball player.  Atkins played collegiately at Saint Joseph's University in Philadelphia from 1994 to 1998 under the name Rashid Bey.

References

External links
Profile at TBLStat.net

1975 births
Living people
American expatriate basketball people in Belgium
American expatriate basketball people in Cyprus
American expatriate basketball people in France
American expatriate basketball people in Poland
American expatriate basketball people in Slovakia
American expatriate basketball people in Switzerland
American expatriate basketball people in Turkey
APOEL B.C. players
Bandırma B.İ.K. players
Basketball players from Philadelphia
BC Oostende players
BK Inter Bratislava players
Galatasaray S.K. (men's basketball) players
JDA Dijon Basket players
Lugano Tigers players
Point guards
Asseco Gdynia players
Saint Joseph's Hawks men's basketball players
Śląsk Wrocław basketball players
Spójnia Stargard players
American men's basketball players